A549  may refer to:
A549 (cell line), a carcinomic human alveolar basal epithelial cell
A549 road (Wales), a road in Great Britain